There have been four baronetcies created for persons with the surname Sykes, two in the Baronetage of Great Britain and two in the Baronetage of the United Kingdom. Three of the creations are extant as of 2008.

The Sykes Baronetcy, of Basildon in the County of Berkshire, was created in the Baronetage of Great Britain on 10 June 1785 for the diplomat and politician Francis Sykes. The second Baronet sat as Member of Parliament for Wallingford.

The Sykes Baronetcy, of Sledmere in the County of York, was created in the Baronetage of Great Britain on 28 March 1783 for Reverend Mark Sykes. He was the son of Richard Sykes, a prosperous merchant, of Kingston upon Hull. The second Baronet was Member of Parliament for Beverley. The third Baronet represented York in the House of Commons. The fourth Baronet was a well-known sportsman. The fifth Baronet served as High Sheriff of Yorkshire in 1869. The sixth Baronet was a traveller, Conservative politician and diplomatic adviser. The seventh Baronet was High Sheriff of Yorkshire in 1948. He adopted the surname of Tatton-Sykes by deed poll in 1977.

Two other members of the family may also be mentioned. Christopher Sykes, second son of the fourth Baronet, was a Member of Parliament. Christopher Sykes, second son of the sixth Baronet, was an author. The family seat is Sledmere House, Yorkshire. See Sykes family of Sledmere for a more extensive history of the family.

The Sykes Baronetcy, of Cheadle in the County of Chester, was created in the Baronetage of the United Kingdom on 10 July 1918 for Alan Sykes, Member of Parliament for Knutsford. The title became extinct on his death in 1950.

The Sykes Baronetcy, of Kingsknowes in Galashiels in the County of Selkirk, was created in the Baronetage of the United Kingdom on 17 June 1921 for Charles Sykes, a woollen manufacturer and Member of Parliament for Huddersfield.

Sykes baronets, of Basildon (1781)

Sir Francis Sykes, 1st Baronet (1732–1804)
Sir Francis William Sykes, 2nd Baronet ( – 1804)
Sir Francis William Sykes, 3rd Baronet (1799–1843)
Sir Francis William Sykes, 4th Baronet (1822–1866)
Sir Frederick Henry Sykes, 5th Baronet (1826–1899)
Sir Henry Sykes, 6th Baronet (1828–1916)
Sir Arthur Sykes, 7th Baronet (1871–1934)
Sir Frederic John Sykes, 8th Baronet (1876–1956)
Sir Francis Godfrey Sykes, 9th Baronet (1907–1990)
Sir Francis John Badcock Sykes, 10th Baronet (1942–2020)
Sir Francis Charles Sykes, 11th Baronet, born 18 June 1968.

The Heir Apparent to the Baronetcy is the 11th Baronet's brother, Edward William Sykes, b. 14 August 1970.

Sykes baronets, of Sledmere (1783–)

 Sir Mark Sykes, 1st Baronet (1711–1783)
 Sir Christopher Sykes, 2nd Baronet (1749–1801)
 Sir Mark Masterman-Sykes, 3rd Baronet (1771–1823)
 Sir Tatton Sykes, 4th Baronet (1772–1863)
 Sir Tatton Sykes, 5th Baronet (1826–1913)
 Sir Tatton Benvenuto Mark Sykes, 6th Baronet (1879–1919)
 Sir Mark Tatton Richard Tatton-Sykes, 7th Baronet (1905–1978)
 Sir Tatton Christopher Mark Sykes, 8th Baronet (1943–)
(1) Jeremy John Sykes (1946–)
(2) Christopher Simon Andrew Sykes (1948–)
(3) Joseph Francis Richard Sykes (1990–)
(4) Richard Nicolas Bernard Sykes (1953–)
Christopher Hugh Sykes (1907–1986)
Mark Richard Sykes (1937–2022)
(5) Thomas Sykes (1974–)
(6) Benjamin Gilbert Sykes (2006–)
(7) Frederick Sykes (1983–)
(8) Joshua Sykes (1988–)
Daniel Henry George Sykes (1916–1968)
Christopher Sykes (1831–1898)
Christopher Sykes (1774–1857)

The heir presumptive is the present holder's brother, Jeremy John Sykes (born 1946).

Sykes baronets, of Cheadle (1918)
Sir Alan John Sykes, 1st Baronet (1868–1950)

Sykes baronets, of Kingsknowes (1921)
Sir Charles Sykes, 1st Baronet (1867–1950)
Sir (Benjamin) Hugh Sykes, 2nd Baronet (1893–1974)
Sir John Charles Anthony le Gallais Sykes, 3rd Baronet (1928–2001)
Sir David Michael Sykes, 4th Baronet (born 1954)

The Heir Apparent to the Baronetcy is Stephen David Sykes (born 1978), eldest son of the 4th Baronet.

Notes

References
Kidd, Charles, Williamson, David (editors). Debrett's Peerage and Baronetage (1990 edition). New York: St Martin's Press, 1990, 

Baronetcies in the Baronetage of Great Britain
Baronetcies in the Baronetage of the United Kingdom
Extinct baronetcies in the Baronetage of the United Kingdom
1781 establishments in Great Britain
1917 establishments in the United Kingdom